Qarah Bolagh (also Romanized as Qarah Bolāgh and Qareh Bolāgh) is a village in Alan Baraghush Rural District, Mehraban District, Sarab County, East Azerbaijan Province, Iran. At the 2006 census, its population was 114, in 26 families.

References 

Populated places in Sarab County